The Stranger  is an Australian science fiction children's television series which first screened on the ABC in 1964 to 1965. It was produced by the Australian Broadcasting Commission. It is notable as Australia's first locally produced science fiction television series and one of the first Australian TV series to be sold overseas.

Synopsis

A schoolmaster finds an unconscious young man on his doorstep, takes him in, and looks after him. A firm friendship develops between the stranger and the headmaster's children Bernard and Jean, and their friend Peter, leading them to discover the stranger's secret: that he is from another planet and has been sent to find a new home on Earth for his people. The stranger, Adam, is joined by fellow alien Varossa. They live in a society without books where they memorize everything. In the second series the children have to enlist the help of the Australian Prime Minister when Peter is kidnapped by the alien, and a procession of intrigues eventually leads them to the aliens' home planet of Soshuniss.

Production
The Stranger began life as a six-part radio series, broadcast on the BBC Home Service from December 1963. This was written by New Zealand-born author G.K. Saunders and starred David Spenser as "The Stranger", Adam Suisse. The Australian TV version followed four months later, again scripted by Saunders, produced by Storry Walton and directed by Gil Brealey, with production design by Geoffrey Wedlock. Two series of six episodes each were produced in 1964 and 1965. It was a major hit in Australia and was sold back to the BBC. The first series (episodes 1 – 6) were broadcast on BBC1 on consecutive Thursdays at 17:25, from 25 February to 1 April 1965 but never repeated. Series 2 (episodes 7–12), have never been shown on network terrestrial television in the UK.

The series starred leading stage and radio actor Ron Haddrick as "The Stranger"; the children were played by Janice Dinnen and Bill Levis as Jean and Bernard (Bernie) Walsh and Michael Thomas as their friend Peter Cannon. The supporting cast included John Faassen as Mr. Walsh and Jessica Noad as Mrs. Walsh, Owen Weingott as Professor Mayer, Chips Rafferty as the Prime Minister, Reg Livermore as Varossa and Mary Mackay as the female Soshun and Ben Gabriel as the male Soshun. Other actors include Ronne Arnold (Dr. Kamutsa – UN), Henry Gilbert (Hutchins – UN), Bernie Baia (Dr. Matoula – UN), Bill Levey, Ivor Bromley as Colonel Nash, and British actor Grant Taylor as Detective Inspector Chisholm and Jeffrey Hodgson as Detective Howell.

Other minor roles are as follows: Robert McDarra plays the Squadron Leader, Denys Burrows is the Chief Police Inspector, Keith Buckley is John Robinson, Stewart Ginn is Senator Anderson and Nigel Lovell plays Group Captain Ponsonby. John Fegan (Homicide) and Douglas Morgan play Police officers. Alex Cann plays Rudolph Lindenberger, Dennis Carroll is Edward Mayer, and Don Philps is Wilson. Notable actors playing Soshuniss Elders include Max Phipps and Reg Evans. Istosin, the pilot of the guide ship, was played by John Unicomb and the pilot of the saucer later in the series is Scott Taylor. Judy Nunn plays a minor role in episode 7. The Lord Mayor was played by Gordon Glenwright, the Lady Mayoress by Thelma Scott and the Town Clerk by Barry Ross.

The series was also notable for the fact that Saunders devised a special language that the aliens spoke amongst themselves and, like later science fiction series such as Babylon 5, they spoke English with a "foreign" accent; in the story Adam can speak German and French, and this leads to the children's father's initial assumption that he is from Switzerland (whence his surname; Adam comes from Adam and Eve).

The series was made with cooperation from the CSIRO with pivotal scenes shot on location at the Parkes Observatory and the facility's radio telescope featured in the iconic opening title sequence. The CSIRO were also consulted on the design of the alien spacecraft that lands on the steps of the Sydney Town Hall where the aliens are greeted by the Prime Minister, played by veteran Australian screen star Chips Rafferty.

In 2019 the entire series was digitally restored by the ABC and in January 2020 was released on their on demand service iview and the ABC TV & iview YouTube channel.

Cast

Main Cast
Ron Haddrick as Adam Suisse, the titular Stranger
Janice Dinnen as Jean Walsh
Bill Levis as Bernie Walsh
Michael Thomas as Peter Cannon
John Faassen as Mr. Walsh
Jessica Noad as Mrs. Walsh
Owen Weingott as Professor Mayer
Reg Livermore as Varossa

Supporting Cast
Mary Mackay as the female Soshun
Ben Gabriel as the male Soshun
Grant Taylor as Detective Inspector Chisolm
Jeffrey Hodgson as Detective Howell
Ivor Bromley as Colonel Nash
Ronne Arnold as Dr. Kamutsa
Alex Cann as Rudolph Lindenberger
Dennis Carroll as Edward Mayer
Chips Rafferty as the Prime Minister

Episodes

Series 1 (1964)

Series 2 (1965)

Adaptation
Over a decade after the series was produced, Saunders wrote a book adaptation which was published by Whitcombe & Tombs in 1978.

References

External links 
 The Stranger on ABC iview

 The Stranger on YouTube
 The Stranger, Australia's answer to Doctor Who, premieres on ABC iview after decades in the vaults

Australian Broadcasting Corporation original programming
Australian science fiction television series
Australian children's television series
1964 Australian television series debuts
1965 Australian television series endings
Black-and-white Australian television shows
1960s children's television series